Kandahar Aryan Football Club is an association football club based in Kandahar, Afghanistan. In September 2005, it played first international friendly match against Shaheed Azizullah, a team from the Balochistan region of Pakistan.

External links
 http://www.national-football-teams.com/v2/club.php?id=4484

References

Football clubs in Afghanistan